Ancylolomia elongata is a moth in the family Crambidae. It was described by Daniel Lucas in 1917. It is found in North Africa, where it has been recorded from Algeria and Morocco.

References

Ancylolomia
Moths described in 1917
Moths of Africa